Governor Lloyd may refer to:

Edward Lloyd (Governor of Maryland) (1779–1834), 13th Governor of Maryland from 1819 to 1826
Edward Lloyd (Colonial Governor of Maryland) (1670–1718), 11th Royal Governor of Maryland from 1709 to 1714
George Lloyd, 1st Baron Lloyd (1879–1941), Governor of Bombay from 1918 to 1923
Henry Lloyd (governor) (1852–1920), 40th Governor of Maryland